The 101st Amphibious Reconnaissance Battalion, known as the Sea Dragon Frogmen, is an elite special operations unit of the Republic of China Army.

The members of the 101st Amphibious Reconnaissance Battalion are commonly known as Sea Dragon Frogmen. The unit specializes in underwater, amphibious, and coastal reconnaissance operations.

They have a role analogous to that of the US Navy Seals. Along with other Taiwanese special operations forces they are expected to play a key role in any conflict with China.

History
The 101st Amphibious Reconnaissance Battalion was founded in 1949 with American assistance as a special purpose coastal surveillance, infiltration, and covert operations unit.

Unit members received a pay raise in 2017.

In 2019 the MoD commenced construction on two new bases on Kinmen and Penghu to support rapid deployments by the 101st.

In 2020 the US Army 1st Special Forces Group released a video which showed themselves training with the 101st Amphibious Reconnaissance Battalion in Taiwan.

Training
Applicants undergo a 15-week training course known as “the iron-man road” which follows a five-day qualification course. Only twenty percent of applicants make it through training. Inducted recruits receive their unit badge pinned to their bare chest.

See also
Airborne Special Service Company
Amphibious Reconnaissance and Patrol Unit
Republic of China Military Police Special Services Company
List of military special forces units

References

Special forces units of the Republic of China
Republic of China Army
Armed forces diving
Army reconnaissance units and formations
Infantry battalions
Military units and formations established in 1949